Sunlightsquare is a pseudonym of British Italian music producer, pianist and digital entrepreneur Claudio Passavanti also known as Doctor Mix on YouTube.

Primarily known for his work in Latin music, jazz fusion and house music, he performs live at festivals and clubs worldwide.

He has collaborated with international artists, most notably with American drummer Steve Gadd and bassist Will Lee.

As a YouTuber, he reviews synthesizers and explains synth-pop songs.

Recent work
His 2008 cover of Stevie Wonder's "Pastime Paradise" was championed by Gilles Peterson,  Joey Negro and Jazz FM DJ Peter Young, among others.

In 2009, Claudio Passavanti recorded a live album in Havana (Cuba) at Radio Rebelde's recording studios, released in February 2010 under the name 'Sunlightsquare Latin Combo'. Havana Central obtained critical acclaim; Blues & Soul magazine described it as "superb".

BBC magazine reviewed his 2011 album Britannia Shing-A-Ling as "a triumph".

Discography

Albums
 as Claudio Passavanti
 After Hours Ritual (1994)
 as Eramo & Passavanti
 Oro e Ruggine (1998), winner of Mia Martini critic award with the track Senza confini
 as Sunlightsquare
 Urban Sessions (2005)
 Mutations for Piano (2006)
 Urban Latin Soul (2008)
 Let's Groove (2009)
 Havana Central (2010)
 Britannia Shing-A-Ling  (2011)
 King Yoruba  (2014)

Singles
 "Pastime Paradise" (2008)
 "I Believe in Miracles" (2010)
 "Para Guarachar" (2010)
 "Super People" (2015)
 "Celebration of Oggun" (2016)

References

External links 
 Sunlightsquare official website
 Claudio Passavanti personal website
 Sunlightsquare discography at Discogs
 Doctor Mix channel on YouTube

English house musicians
English dance musicians
Latin jazz musicians
British jazz musicians